Aechmea grazielae is a species of flowering plant in the genus Aechmea. This species is endemic to the State of Rio de Janeiro in Brazil.

References

grazielae
Flora of Brazil
Plants described in 1987